Darb-e Shesh Ab (also Romanized as Darb-e Shesh Āb; also known as Darv-e Shesh Āb) is a village in Kushk Rural District, Abezhdan District, Andika County, Khuzestan Province, Iran. At the 2006 census, its population was 34, in 7 families.

References 

Populated places in Andika County